List of largest optical telescopes in the 18th century, are listings of what were, for the time period of the 18th century, large optical telescopes. The list includes various refractor and reflector that were active some time between about 1699 to 1801. It is oriented towards astronomy, not terrestrial telescopes (e.g. spyglass).

Many of the largest were metal mirror reflectors, some of which had substational apertures even for the 20th century. One problems was that many instrument makers including Herschel did not pass on their mirror making craft, and by the next century reflectors had largely been passed over in favour of small achromats (2 lens refractors). It was not until the 20th century that really large reflectors would predominate once again. Some of the achievements in astronomy of the 19th century telescopes include the discovery of the planet Uranus, the Messier catalog, and overall increased detections of comets, stars, star catalogs, and other charting.

The major breakthrough in the 1700s, was the discovery of two and even three lens telescopes and increased spread of reflecting telescopes and their designs. In this period reflectors used metal mirrors not metal coated glass, which was not pioneered until the next century.

Selected Reflectors & Refractors
The main telescope technologies during this period were refractors with non-achromatic objectives (single lens), speculum metal reflectors, refractors with achromatic doublets objective (doublet lens), and apochromatic triplets (after 1760s) objectives. The list is inherently limited by what examples and records survived.

 
 
 

* (First light or Build Completion to Inactive or Deconstruction)

Gallery

See also
Lists of telescopes
List of largest optical telescopes in the 19th century
List of largest optical telescopes in the 20th century
List of largest optical telescopes historically
List of largest optical reflecting telescopes
Peter Dollond

References

Further reading

OUTLINE OF 18TH CENTURY ASTRONOMY - NYSkies Astronomy

External links
 List of large reflecting telescopes (Modern)
 The World's Largest Optical Telescopes (Modern)
 Largest optical telescopes of the world (Historical & Modern)
 Stellafane telescope links

Lists of telescopes
18th century-related lists
Telescopes